Electromagnetic flux may refer to one of the following:
Flux or flux density of electromagnetic radiation
Electric flux and magnetic flux
Radiative flux.